Andorra la Vella is the capital of the Principality of Andorra. It is located high in the east Pyrenees, between France and Spain. It is also the name of the parish that surrounds the capital.

, the city has a population of 22,886, and the urban area, which includes Escaldes-Engordany plus satellite villages, has over 40,000 inhabitants.

The principal industry is tourism, although the country also earns foreign income from being a tax haven. Furniture and brandies are local products.

Name 
Andorra la Vella means "Andorra the Town", to distinguish it from the Principality of Andorra as a whole. Although in Catalan the word vella (like French vieille) is derived from the Latin word vetula which means "old", the Vella here (like French ville and Catalan vila) is derived from the Latin word villa and means "town".

History

The site of Andorra la Vella has been settled since prior to the Christian era—notably by the Andosin tribe from the late Neolithic. The state is one of the Marca Hispanica created and protected by Charlemagne in the eighth century as a buffer from the Moorish settlers in the Iberian Peninsula.

The settlement of Andorra la Vella has been the principal city of Andorra since 1278 when the French and the Episcopal co-princes agreed to joint suzerainty. Andorra la Vella's old town—the Barri Antic—includes streets and buildings dating from this time. Its most notable building is the Casa de la Vall—constructed in the early sixteenth century—which has been the state's parliamentary house since 1702. Andorra la Vella was, during this period, the capital of a largely isolated and feudal state, which retained its independence due to this principle of co-sovereignty.

Well into the twentieth century, the area around Andorra la Vella remained largely forgotten. After political turmoil in the 1930s and an attempted coup by Boris Skossyreff, an informal democracy developed.

In 1993, the country's first constitution formalised this parliamentary democracy with executive, legislative, and judicial branches located in Andorra la Vella.

During this period, Andorra also developed as a tax haven, resulting in the construction of modern banking offices in Andorra La Vella. The city also developed its skiing facilities, to the extent that Andorra la Vella was Andorra's applicant city for the XXI Olympic Winter Games, the 2010 Winter Olympics. However, Andorra la Vella was not selected by the IOC as a candidate city, following the evaluation report of an IOC commission. It also hosted both the 1991 and 2005 Games of the Small States of Europe.

Geography
It adjoins the urban area of Escaldes-Engordany.

Climate
Andorra la Vella has an oceanic climate (Köppen climate classification: Cfb), with warm days and cool nights in summer, and chilly to cold, snowy winters. Temperatures in the city are lowered by the altitude (1,075 metres) compared with lowland areas.

Subdivisions
The parish of Andorra la Vella is divided into the villages of Andorra la Vella itself, La Margineda and Santa Coloma.

Landmarks 

The city's old town is characterized by old stone streets and houses. The central Església de Sant Esteve (Saint Stephen) church is part of the area that guidebooks often label as a picturesque part of the city. This was built in a Romanesque style in the eleventh century. As mentioned earlier, the old town also includes the country's historic parliament building. Probably the oldest building in the city is another church, dating from the ninth century, is the Church of Santa Coloma d'Andorra.

Demographics 

Native Andorrans account for only a third (33%) of the population, with the plurality being Spanish (43%), and notable minorities of Portuguese (11%) and French (7%).
Most of the inhabitants are Roman Catholics.
There is a high life expectancy of over 80 years.

Culture

The city is the country's cultural centre, with the Government Exhibition Hall acting as a main theatre and museum. The piazza outside the parliament building is also the location of a number of events, and the town hosts a music festival every winter.

Languages 

Catalan is the official language, although Spanish, Portuguese and French are also spoken.

Notable people 

 Elidà Amigó i Montanya (born 1935 and died 2020 in Andorra la Vella) historian and activist, a leader in Andorra's women's suffrage movement 
Marc Forné Molné (born 1946 in Andorra la Vella) was the Prime Minister of Andorra from 1994 to 2005 
 Lluís Claret (born 1951 in Andorra la Vella), cellist, especially of chamber music
 Albert Salvadó (born 1951 in Andorra la Vella and died in 2020), writer and industrial engineer 
 Jaume Bartumeu GCIH (born 1954) lawyer and politician, who served as head of government from 2009 to 2011
 Juli Minoves (born 1969 in Andorra la Vella) diplomat, author and the 13th President of Liberal International
 Pere López Agràs (born 1971 in Andorra la Vella) politician who served as an acting Prime Minister in 2011
 Vanessa Mendoza Cortés (born 1980 in Andorra la Vella) psychologist and activist who campaigns for the decriminalisation of abortion

Sport 

 Javier Sánchez (born 1968 in Andorra la Vella) is a former professional tennis player, 1986 to 2000
 Sophie Dusautoir Bertrand (born 1972 in Andorra la Vella) ski mountaineer
 Toni Besolí (born 1976 in Andorra la Vella) judoka, who competed in the men's middleweight
 Marc Bernaus (born 1977 in Andorra la Vella) retired footballer who played as a left back.
 Santiago Deu (born 1980) former middle-distance freestyle swimmer, competed 2000 Summer Olympics in Sydney
 Meritxell Sabate (born 1980 in Andorra la Vella) former long-distance freestyle swimmer, competed in the 1996 and 2000 Summer Olympics
 Marta Roure (born 1981 in Andorra la Vella) singer and actress
 Carolina Cerqueda (born 1985 in Andorra la Vella) former sprint freestyle swimmer, competed in the 2004 Summer Olympics
 Marc Garcia (born 1988 in Andorra la Vella), commonly known as Chiqui, is an Andorran footballer
 Xavier Cardelús (born 1998 in Andorra la Vella), is a motorcycle rider, who competes in 2022 MotoE World Cup

Economy and infrastructure

Andorra la Vella is the country's commercial centre. In the country as a whole, 80% of the GDP is derived from the 10 million tourists who visit annually. The city is also the centre for the many banks and businesses that thrive from its tax haven status. The state is not a member of the European Union, but has a customs arrangement with the EU, and uses the euro.

Transportation
Andorra la Vella has direct access to air transportation with commercial helicopter flights from Andorra la Vella Heliport, located in the city centre. Nearby airports located in Spain and France provide access to international flights with the nearest airports being Perpignan (156 km away) and Lleida (160 km away). The largest nearby airports are Toulouse (Tolosa), Girona and Barcelona.

Andorra la Vella does not have a train station, although there are bus shuttle services linking the city to train stations at L'Hospitalet-près-l'Andorre (France) and Lleida in Spain. There are also shuttle buses from Barcelona, Girona and Reus' airports to Andorra la Vella.

Education

The Instituto Español de Andorra (IEA), a Spanish international secondary school, is in La Margineda in Andorra la Vella. The Spanish primary school is Escuela Española de Andorra la Vella.

International relations

Twin towns – sister cities
Andorra la Vella is twinned with the following cities:

 Sant Pol de Mar, Spain
 Valls, Spain

Union of Ibero-American Capital Cities
Andorra la Vella is part of the Union of Ibero-American Capital Cities from 12 October 1982 establishing brotherly relations with the following cities:

 Asunción, Paraguay
 Bogotá, Colombia
 Buenos Aires, Argentina
 Caracas, Venezuela
 Guatemala City, Guatemala
 Havana, Cuba
 Quito, Ecuador
 La Paz, Bolivia
 Lima, Peru
 Lisbon, Portugal
 Madrid, Spain
 Managua, Nicaragua
 Mexico City, Mexico
 Montevideo, Uruguay
 Panama City, Panama
 Rio de Janeiro, Brazil
 San Jose, Costa Rica
 San Juan, Puerto Rico
 San Salvador, El Salvador
 Santiago, Chile
 Santo Domingo, Dominican Republic
 Tegucigalpa, Honduras

Notes

References

External links

 City council of Andorra la Vella 
 Sant Esteve church in Circulo Romanico page
 Santa Coloma Church in Circulo Romanico page

 
Capitals in Europe
Parishes of Andorra
Populated places in Andorra